Attelabus nitens is a species of leaf-rolling weevil in the beetle family Attelabidae, found in Europe. It is so named because the female has a habit of rolling itself on oak leaves after laying an egg.

Gallery

References

External links

 

Weevils
Beetles described in 1925